The 2018 VTV9 - Binh Dien International Women's Volleyball Cup was the 12th staging. The tournament was held in Tam Kỳ, Quảng Nam Province, Vietnam.

Pools composition

Pool standing procedure
 Number of matches won
 Match points
 Sets ratio
 Points ratio
 Result of the last match between the tied teams

Match won 3–0 or 3–1: 3 match points for the winner, 0 match points for the loser
Match won 3–2: 2 match points for the winner, 1 match point for the loser

Preliminary round
All times are Vietnam Standard Time (UTC+07:00).

Pool A

        

|}

|}

Pool B

        

|}

|}

Classification 5th-8th
All times are Vietnam Standard Time (UTC+07:00).

Classification 5th-8th

|}

7th place

|}

5th place

|}

Final round
All times are Vietnam Standard Time (UTC+07:00).

Semifinals

|}

3rd place

|}

Final

|}

Final standing

Team Roster
Wu Han, Rong Wanqianbai, Wang Yuqi, Diao Linyu, Zhou Xinyi, Xu Ruoya, Wang Chenyue, Bai Jie, Chen Yixuan, Wei Yuxin, Yang Wenjin, Zang Qianqian
Head Coach: Cai Bin

Awards

Most Valuable Player
  Holly Toliver (Bring It Promotions)

Best Setter
  Diao Linyu (Jiangsu)

Best Outside Hitters
  Trần Thị Thanh Thúy (VTV Bình Điền Long An)
  Allison Mayfield (Bring It Promotions)

Best Middle Blockers
  Wang Chenyue (Jiangsu)
  Zheng Yixin (Fujian)

Best Opposite Spiker
  Wu Han (Jiangsu)

Best Libero
  Nguyễn Thị Kim Liên (VTV Bình Điền Long An)

Best Young Player
  Dương Thị Hên (VTV Bình Điền Long An)

Miss Volleyball
  Sabina Altynbekova (Almaty VC)

See also
VTV9 - Binh Dien International Women's Volleyball Cup

References

External links
vtvbinhdiencup.vn
 volleyball.vn
bongchuyensaigon.vn

VTV9 – Binh Dien International Women's Volleyball Cup
Voll
2018 in women's volleyball
May 2018 sports events in Asia